Supertwink is a 2006 American comedy film directed, written, and filmed by Richard Christy and Sal Governale. Produced and made for subscribers of Howard TV, an In Demand digital cable service operated by Howard Stern, the film stars members of Stern's radio show staff and "Wack Packers". The film premiered at the Pioneer Theater in New York City on January 4, 2006.

Despite claims that the film had a $4,000 budget, Christy stated on Stern's radio show that he spent no more than $700. When Stern asked Roger Ebert and Richard Roeper to review the film, Ebert refused to watch it, while Roeper's pan was run over the film's ending credits. According to producer Doug Goodstein, Stern has distanced himself from the film.

Premise
An evil heterosexual supervillain Dr. Hetero (High Pitch Eric), vows to destroy the homosexual world. Supertwink (J.D. Harmeyer) is called to save the day.

Cast

 JD Harmeyer as Supertwink and Bo Cocky
 Benjamin Bronk as Queen Benjamin
 Steve Freid as Lord Rectum
 Dan "The Song Parody Man" Cooper as Boy Servant
 Sal Governale as Paxton Fudge and Captain Sack
 Richard Christy as Rusty Peters
 Office Gazers: Doug Goodstein, Isaac Mark, Mike Gange, Scott DePace, Chris Costa, Sean Gordon, Glenn Stockfisch
 High Pitch Eric as Dr. Hetero
 Mike Bocchetti as Cock Hudson
 Cock Hudson's Bar Dancers: Gay Ramone, Thomas J. Gorham, Brian O'Toole Jr., Joey Boots, Duane C. Cecil, Michael Denicola
 Ronnie "The Limo Driver" Mund as Cock Hudson's Bar Doorman
 Artie Lange as Cock Hudson's Bar Plumber
 Fred "The Elephant Boy" as Man With A Gerbil Stuck In His Ass
 Will Murray as Cum Faced Man
 Tony Landolfi as Glitter Boy
 Joey Boots as Fagola
 Dr. Hetero's Women: Geraldine Gutierrez, Champagne Gillis, Seven von Sin
 Gary the Retard as Man Under Paxton Fudge's Desk

References

External links

Howard Stern OnDemand
Photo gallery from the premiere of Supertwink

American independent films
2006 films
2006 short films
American LGBT-related short films
2000s superhero comedy films
Fiction set on Uranus
Howard Stern
2006 comedy films
American comedy short films
2006 LGBT-related films
2006 independent films
2000s English-language films
2000s American films